Hamilton, Ontario's culture has built on its historical and social background. Some attractions include a museum of aircraft (Canadian Warplane Heritage Museum), HMCS Haida National Historic Site, historic naval ship; Canada's most famous warship and the last remaining Tribal Class in the world, a stately residence of a Prime Minister of Upper Canada (Dundurn Castle), a functioning nuclear reactor at McMaster University, a horticultural haven (Royal Botanical Gardens), the Canadian Football Hall of Fame, African Lion Safari and Christ the King Cathedral.

Arts

Growth in the arts and culture sector has garnered high level media attention for Hamilton. A Globe and Mail article in 2006, entitled "Go West, Young Artist," focused on the growing art scene in Hamilton. The second Friday of every month brings the James North Art Crawl where residents and visitors stroll the area's lively sidewalks, savouring the diverse flavours of local artists and nearby cafes and restaurants. James Street is one of Hamilton's most historic neighbourhoods. The Factory Media Centre opened up a new home on James Street North in 2006. Hamilton Artists Inc., founded in 1975, is also located in the downtown core on the corner of James St. N. and Cannon St. and is one of the oldest artist-run centres in Canada.  The collective has a membership of over 250 artists from around the area, and recently featured the work of Attila Richard Lukacs. Art galleries are springing up on many streets across the City: James Street, King William Street, Locke Street and King Street, to name a few. This, coupled with growth in the Downtown condo market set to draw people back to the Core, is having a strong, positive impact on the cultural fabric of the city. Steve Balaban CFA initiated its largest rollup of over 200 billboards, promoting entertainment within the city. The opening of the Downtown Arts Centre on Rebecca Street has spurred further creative activities in the Core. The Community Centre for Media Arts (CCMA) continues to operate in Downtown Hamilton. The CCMA works with marginalized populations and combines new media services such as website development, graphic design, video, and information technology, with arts education and skills development programming.

The McMaster Museum of Art (MMA), founded at McMaster University in 1967, houses and exhibits the university's art collection of more than 7,000 objects, including historical, modern and contemporary art, notably the Levy Collection of Impressionist and Post Impressionist paintings and a collection of over 300 German Expressionist prints. It also presents the McMaster School of the Arts studio art program graduation exhibition (aka SUMMA) each spring.

The Hammertheatre Company, founded in January 2007, is a company devoted to theatre research in Hamilton and also devoted to the plays of artistic director Sky Gilbert whose plays will deal with issues of gender and sexuality. Gilbert is also the founder of legendary Toronto theatre, Buddies in Bad Times. There, Gilbert's iconic gay plays found an enthusiastic, vast audience. The theatre is at the old Ancient Order of Foresters building in the James Street North neighbourhood where Hamilton's Art scene continues to grow and where Sky has been living since 2003.

The 70-seat Staircase Cafe Theatre on Dundurn Street North provides space for a variety of cultural activities. The Staircase originally was opened by Hugh MacLeod in 1998, evolving and expanding from an improvisational comedy workshop to include an artist's gallery, a cafe, a theatre for film and live acts, and a rehearsal space. A former variety store next door was also acquired. The store has been converted into an additional multi-purpose space on the lower level, and houses Think|Haus, Hamilton's Hackerspace, on the upper level.

Music
Ronnie Hawkins came to Canada in 1958. His first gig was at the Golden Rail in Hamilton where he became an overnight success. It was a result of Hawkins success in Hamilton that he decided to move to Canada permanently. His career spans over five decades and 25 records. His hits include, "Forty Days", "Mary Lou", and "Hey Bo Diddley". Colonel Harold Kudlats, was given nickname "The Colonel" by Ronnie Hawkins. It was Kudlats who booked Ronnie Hawkins and the Hawks in Hamilton for the first time. He has worked with acts Fats Domino, Duke Ellington & Louis Armstrong. Kudlats later went on to become agent for Levon Helm and The Band. He is also the Eugene Levy's uncle. Also in 1958, Conway Twitty, singer-songwriter and his band were in town and were playing at the Flamingo Lounge where Hamilton Place is located today. Legend has it that the drummer, Jack Nance, wrote "It's Only Make Believe" between sets, although another story puts them at the nearby Fischer Hotel. The song was recorded in 1958 and became the first of nine Top 40 hits for Twitty, selling eight million copies.

The Hamilton region has produced a number of talented musical artists over the years. Some of these include King Biscuit Boy (Canadian blues musician), Steve Negas (drummer for progressive rock band Saga), Skip Prokop (drummer and band leader for Lighthouse + The Paupers), Stan Rogers (Canadian folk singer), Neil Peart (drummer and lyricist for the progressive rock band Rush (Hagersville, ON)), Lorraine Segato (lead vocalist for 1980s pop group Parachute Club), Ian Thomas (singer/ songwriter), Jackie Washington (legendary Canadian blues singer) and Tom Wilson (veteran of the Canadian music scene).

Hamilton was also an important centre of punk rock in the 1970s and early 1980s, spawning influential acts such as Teenage Head, Forgotten Rebels, Simply Saucer and The Dik Van Dykes.

A number of recording studios call Hamilton home. The Sonic Unyon label started and fostered the Hamilton sound in the early 1990s and continues today as one of Canada's most successful independent record labels and distributors. In 1985 Daniel Lanois, opened Grant Avenue Studios a landmark in Hamilton. A solo artist in his own right he's made his mark as a producer for some of the world's biggest musical acts. Some of these include Bob Dylan, Peter Gabriel and U2. Steve Negas is also a producer with a studio in town. Some of his clients include Chris De Burgh, The Nylons, Liona Boyd and Saga.

Hamilton has hosted the Juno Awards a total of six times, in 1995, 1996, 1997, 1999, 2001, and 2015. The Juno Awards are awards of achievement presented to Canadian musical artists and bands. 1996 was the most memorable one. Anne Murray was the host for the ceremonies and prominent nominees were Alanis Morissette and Shania Twain. The Canadian Music Hall of Fame Inductees that evening were: David Clayton-Thomas (Blood, Sweat & Tears), Denny Doherty (The Mamas & the Papas), John Kay (Steppenwolf), Domenic Troiano (played w/ various artists) and Zal Yanovsky (The Lovin' Spoonful).

Festivals

Hamilton has hosted several cultural and craft fairs since the 1960s, notably Festival of Friends, which made it a major tourist destination. The Festival of Friends, founded in 1975, is the largest annual free music event in the country. Burton Cummings, Lighthouse, Bruce Cockburn, Steve Earle and Richie Havens have been among the main stage headliners at Gage Park on Gage Avenue. WestJet is a major sponsor of the festival. Supercrawl is an annual, free, two-day festival featuring indie music and art, and attracts over 100,000 visitors. The Winona Peach Festival will be celebrating its 40th-anniversary in the summer of 2007; established in 1967. 4-time winner of the "Top 50 Ontario Festivals" from Festivals and Events Ontario. The 2006 attendance was in excess of 230,000 and attracts attendees from Ontario the Western New York area. It's a food and beverage festival that includes free entertainment, arts & crafts, a midway, pageant and car show that features vintage vehicles, hot rods & classics. Hamilton is also home to the Mustard Festival because Hamilton is home to the largest miller of dry mustard in the world. It's held annually at Ferguson Station, Ferguson Avenue at Hamilton's International Village and is another summertime food & beverage festival that features some of the top Blues and Jazz acts in the region. Hamilton is also home to the Fix Our World Festival, bringing awareness to poverty, environment, peace and AIDS. It's held annually at Pier 4 Waterfront Park, Pier 4 Waterfront Park and is another summertime music festival featuring some of the top local talent in the region.

Ottawa Street, is known as the Textile District and is Hamilton's "Decor Destination." It is the largest Fabric and Textile District in Canada. It also hosts and annual Ottawa Street Streetfest, a shopping extravaganza that includes shopping deals, entertainment, foods, crafts, all part of outdoor street sale.

Locke Street, has festivals held throughout the year. The first noteworthy one is called Spring Blooms on Locke. It's an annual festival that marks the end of winter and is also a fund raiser for sick children. Then there is the one simply called The Locke Street Festival where each September the street is closed off for live entertainment, street vendors and food. There is also the Christmas Open House where they welcome the holidays with late opening, food, drink and carollers each November.

Every summer in August the Cactus Festival is held in Dundas.

The Great Lakes Expo7 is a 3-day annual springtime festival held at Bayfront Park and Pier 4 Park. The purpose of the festival is to improve people's knowledge of how everyone can improve and protect the fresh water within the Great Lakes. Also included, an Adventure Zone, Enviro Zone, Kid's Zone, Full size Midway, Live Music, Food vendors, Arts & Crafts and more. In 2007 the festival will be held the last weekend of May.

The Royal Botanical Gardens plays host to a number of festivals throughout the year. Some of these include the Tulip Celebration, Mother's Day Brunch, Lilac Celebration, Iris Festival, Rose Celebration and Music @ THE GARDENS.

Hamilton also hosts a number of free Concerts in the city, most of which are held in the summer months. Concerts are located at Gore Park, Whitehern Museum, International Village, Sam Lawrence Park, Lloyd D. Jackson Square (Plaze level, rooftop gardens) and the Hamilton Farmer's Market.

Core Entertainment

Hamilton also hosts several key venues operated by Core Entertainment. Core Entertainment is the engine that drives over 400 events to FirstOntario Centre, FirstOntario Concert Hall (both the Great Hall and The Studio) and Molson Canadian Studio. Core Entertainment is powered by Comcast Spectacor. Among these facilities is Hamilton's largest venue, FirstOntario Centre (formerly Copps Coliseum), a 17,500-seat enclosed arena that has served as the home for the Hamilton Bulldogs (OHL) ice hockey club since 2015 and routinely features a variety of sport, commercial and concert events throughout the year.  Notable artists who have performed at FirstOntario Centre include U2, Tool, System of a Down, Metallica, Elton John, Rod Stewart and Aerosmith. Further events can be found just down the road at FirstOntario Concert Hall, a 2,193 seat performing arts theatre located less than a two-minute walk from FirstOntario Centre. FirstOntario Concert Hall is the home of the Hamilton Philharmonic Orchestra and boasts one of the leading architectural designs for acoustics in Canada.  Notable performances include the annual festive production of 'The Nutcracker' and a number of internationally recognized entertainers such as Tom Jones, Sarah McLachlan, Hall & Oates and Billy Connolly.

The Hamilton Convention Centre is also a major downtown event facility, and is connected to FirstOntario Concert hall, but is a separate operation run by Carmen's Group

References

External links
 Core Entertainment (www.CoreEntertainment.ca)
 Hamilton's Independent Music Scene
 Hamilton Mardis Gras Festival